Epping was a parliamentary constituency represented in the House of Commons of the UK Parliament from 1885 to 1974. It elected one Member of Parliament (MP) by the first past the post system of election.

History 
Epping was one of eight single-member divisions of Essex (later classified as county constituencies) created by the Redistribution of Seats Act 1885, replacing the three two member divisions of East, South and West Essex.

The seat underwent a significant loss of territory at the 1945 boundary review, with the majority of the electorate forming the new constituency of Woodford. It was abolished for the February 1974 general election when it was divided between the new seats of Chingford, Epping Forest and Harlow.

Its most prominent MP was Winston Churchill, who served as Prime Minister twice, the local MP for twenty-one years from 1924 to 1945, spanning the middle part of his long service as an MP. From 1945, he was the MP for Woodford.

In the 1955 and 1959 general elections, the celebrated cricket commentator and journalist John Arlott stood as the Liberal Party candidate.

Boundaries and boundary changes 
1885–1918: The Sessional Divisions of Epping, Harlow, and Ongar, and part of the Sessional Division of Dunmow.

Formed from part of the abolished West Division. See below for areas covered.

1918–1945: The Urban Districts of Buckhurst Hill, Chingford, Epping, Loughton, Waltham Holy Cross, Wanstead, and Woodford, and the Rural District of Epping.

Gained Woodford from the abolished Walthamstow Division of Essex and Wanstead from the Romford Division.  Lost eastern part of Division, including Chipping Ongar, to Chelmsford, and northern part of Division, including Great Dunmow and Hatfield Broad Oak, to Saffron Walden.

1945–1974: The Borough of Chingford, the Urban Districts of Epping and Waltham Holy Cross, and the Rural District of Epping.

The House of Commons (Redistribution of Seats) Act 1944 set up Boundaries Commissions to carry out periodic reviews of the distribution of parliamentary constituencies. It also authorised an initial review to subdivide abnormally large constituencies in time for the 1945 election. This was implemented by the Redistribution of Seats Order 1945 under which Epping was divided into two constituencies.  As a consequence, the Municipal Borough of Wanstead and Woodford (created from amalgamating the two separate Urban Districts) and the Urban District of Chigwell (previously a parish in the Rural District of Epping which had also absorbed the former Urban Districts of Buckhurst Hill and Loughton), formed as the new Parliamentary Borough of Woodford.

The seat was abolished in 1974 following the Second Periodic Review of Westminster constituencies. The Urban District of Chingford had been absorbed into the London Borough of Waltham Forest on its creation within Greater London and now formed the basis for the new Borough Constituency of Chingford within that Borough.  The Urban District of Harlow, which had been created from the Rural District of Epping, together with neighbouring parishes (now part of the merged Rural District of Epping and Ongar), formed the new County Constituency of Harlow.  Remaining parts included in the new County Constituency of Epping Forest.

Areas covered

1Renamed Wanstead and Woodford, with minor boundary changes, for the 1964 general election (S.I. 1960/454).

Members of Parliament

Election results

Elections in the 1880s

Elections in the 1890s

Elections in the 1900s

Elections in the 1910s 

General Election 1914–15:

Another General Election was required to take place before the end of 1915. The political parties had been making preparations for an election to take place and by July 1914, the following candidates had been selected; 
Unionist: Amelius Lockwood
Liberal:

Elections in the 1920s

Elections in the 1930s

Elections in the 1940s 
General Election 1939–40:

Another General Election was required to take place before the end of 1940. The political parties had been making preparations for an election to take place from 1939 and by the end of this year, the following candidates had been selected; 
Conservative: Winston Churchill
Labour: Leon MacLaren

Elections in the 1950s

Elections in the 1960s

Elections in the 1970s

References

Sources

Parliamentary constituencies in Essex (historic)
Constituencies of the Parliament of the United Kingdom established in 1885
Constituencies of the Parliament of the United Kingdom disestablished in 1974
Constituencies of the Parliament of the United Kingdom represented by a sitting Prime Minister